The football tournament at the 1977 Southeast Asian Games is the first edition of the tournament as the Southeast Asian Games.  It was held from 19 November to 26 November 1977 in Kuala Lumpur, Malaysia.

Teams

Tournament

Group stage

Group A

Group B

Knockout stage

Semi-finals

Bronze medal match

Gold medal match

Winners

Medal winners

Notes

References 
Southeast Asian Games 1977 at RSSSF
SEA Games 1977 at AFF official website 

Sou
Football at the Southeast Asian Games
1977
1977 in Malaysian sport
1977 Southeast Asian Games events